Stamps is a city in Lafayette County, Arkansas, United States. The population was 1,693 at the 2010 census, down from 2,131 at the 2000 census.

History
A post office has been in operation in Stamps since 1887. The community has the name of the local Stamps family. Stamps was the shop headquarters for the former Louisiana and Arkansas Railway until the relocation in the early 1920s to Minden in Webster Parish in northern  Louisiana.

Stamps has been noted on lists of unusual place names. An early postmaster quipped that Stamps was "the only town in the U.S. that stamps Stamps on stamps".

Geography
Stamps is in northeastern Lafayette County in southwestern Arkansas. U.S. Route 82 passes through the northern side of the city, leading west  to Lewisville, the county seat, and east  to Buckner. Arkansas Highway 53 has its northern terminus at US 82 and leads south through the center of Stamps  to the state line near Springhill, Louisiana.

Lake June lies within the southern part of the city limits.

Demographics

2020 census

As of the 2020 United States census, there were 1,258 people, 657 households, and 378 families residing in the city.

2000 census
As of the census of 2000, there were 2,131 people, 830 households, and 541 families residing in the town. The racial makeup of the city was 44.30% White, 54.48% Black or African American, 0.52% Native American, 0.09% Asian, 0.05% Pacific Islander, and 0.56% from two or more races. Of the population 0.61% was Hispanic or Latino of any race.

There were 830 households, out of which 30.7% had children under the age of 18 living with them, 37.8% were married couples living together, 21.7% had a female householder with no husband present, and 34.7% were non-families. Of all households 31.7% were made up of individuals, and 17.6% had someone living alone who was 65 years of age or older.  The average household size was 2.46 and the average family size was 3.10.

In the city, the population was spread out, with 27.1% under the age of 18, 9.1% from 18 to 24, 23.7% from 25 to 44, 20.6% from 45 to 64, and 19.5% who were 65 years of age or older.  The median age was 37 years. For every 100 females, there were 87.6 males.  For every 100 females age 18 and over, there were 77.6 males.

The median income for a household in the town was $22,194, and the median income for a family was $26,591. Males had a median income of $25,667 versus $17,125 for females. The per capita income for the city was $11,440.  About 22.8% of families and 27.8% of the population were below the poverty line, including 31.0% of those under age 18 and 24.2% of those age 65 or over.

Education 
Public education for elementary and secondary students is provided by the Lafayette County School District, which includes Lafayette County Elementary School and Lafayette County High School. The school's mascot and athletic emblem is the Cougar.

On July 1, 2003, the Stamps School District consolidated with the Lewisville School District to form the Lafayette County district.

Infrastructure

Highways
  U.S. Highway 82
  Arkansas Highway 53

Notable people
Maya Angelou (1928–2014), raised in Stamps by her paternal grandmother, tells about growing up in the Black community of Stamps in I Know Why the Caged Bird Sings – author and poet
George Doherty (1920–1987), mathematics and physical education teacher in Stamps – American football player and inspirational coach
Earl T. Ricks (1908–1954), raised in Stamps – United States Air Force major general
Rolling Thunder (1916–1997), born in Stamps – self-identified hippie medicine man

References

Cities in Arkansas
Cities in Lafayette County, Arkansas